The Wonders of Life pavilion was an attraction at Epcot at Walt Disney World in Lake Buena Vista, Florida. It was devoted to health care, focusing on the human body, physical fitness, medicine and nutrition. Attractions included Body Wars and Cranium Command. It is located inside a golden colored dome between Mission: SPACE (formerly Horizons) and Wonders of Xandar (formerly Universe of Energy). It opened on October 19, 1989, and closed on January 1, 2007. From 2007 to 2018, the Pavilion acted as EPCOT's Festival Center, before becoming a construction site in March 2019 in preparation for the upcoming Play! Pavilion to replace it.

The original attractions within the building have been closed and partially removed. In February 2019, it was announced that a new Play! Pavilion would be built in the domed show building formerly occupied by Wonders of Life, and was originally scheduled to open in time for Walt Disney World's 50th anniversary in 2021, but due to the park's temporary closure during the COVID-19 pandemic, the pavilion's opening date was delayed indefinitely.

History
The idea of a pavilion devoted to health and fitness dates back to the original concept of the EPCOT Center theme park, but no corporate sponsor could be found to cover the costs. It was not until MetLife signed on that the pavilion was finally constructed, and it featured two main attractions: Cranium Command and Body Wars, the first thrill ride located in EPCOT.  Also featured was a theater (home to The Making of Me), restaurant and interactive attractions that evolved around the idea of health and wellness.

The Wonders of Life pavilion was officially announced on January 22, 1988, with construction beginning the following month. It opened to the general public on October 19, 1989.

MetLife ended its sponsorship in June 2001, which led to the slow decline of the pavilion. On January 4, 2004, Disney made the decision to make it seasonal operation only. It reopened when the park was projected to hit near capacity during the high spring months and Christmas season. Its most recent operational phase was November 26, 2006, through January 1, 2007.  In 2007, the pavilion closed permanently, with no official reason given.  While it is not operational to the public, it is still commonly used for private and corporate events.

In 2007, temporary walls were placed around the existing attractions when Epcot hosted the Food and Wine festival in the pavilion. The "Body Wars" sign was removed in 2008, replaced by a temporary Garden Town sign while the imprints from the original marquee were painted over. By 2009, significant portions of the Body Wars attraction had been removed. The "Celebrate the Joy of Life" sign was removed following in 2009, while most of the exhibits left were removed. The pavilion also received a paint job inside using mute colors such as white and light green.

The pavilion then operated seasonally as the center for the Epcot International Flower and Garden Festival and the Epcot International Food & Wine Festival as the Festival Center. For those events, it hosted seminars, videos, presentations, and more. It was used as a central merchandise location during the two festivals as well. All attractions are shut down and their signs have been removed. As of November 2014, the Body Wars ride simulators have been dismantled. The queue still exists, but most of the props and other electronics have been removed. As of 2017, Cranium Command has had its queue and pre-show partially dismantled, but the theater - including the animatronics, lighting, seats, and staging area - remains intact. The theater that was used for The Making of Me is still used for various movies and presentations during the event.

On September 11, 2012, Walt Disney Imagineering filed a notice of commencement with the Orange County Comptroller’s office indicating the intentions for a "selective demolition" to take place at the pavilion. In February 2019, it was announced that a new interactive pavilion would be built in the dome formerly occupied by Wonders of Life. The pavilion was originally scheduled to open in time for Walt Disney World's 50th anniversary in 2021, but was delayed during the COVID-19 pandemic.

Attractions
 Cranium Command - A theater show with audio-animatronic actors and a movie. The show explained the functions of the brain and its interaction with the human body.
 Frontiers of Medicine - Listen to stories about medicine and the brain on small televisions.
 Body Wars - A motion simulator ride taking guests on a Fantastic Voyage-like trip through the heart, lungs, and brain. The film shown was directed by Leonard Nimoy, and starred actors Tim Matheson, Elisabeth Shue, and Dakin Matthews. Often compared to Star Tours at Disney's Hollywood Studios and Disneyland as its counterpart.
 Coach's Corner - Guests can swing a bat while a professional player gives tips. 
 Goofy About Health - A multimedia show about healthy living hosted by Goofy, using clips from his cartoons.
 Fitness Fairgrounds - Tested guests' athletic abilities
 Sensory Funhouse - An interactive playground which tested guest's sensory abilities, including an Ames room
 Audio Antics - A listening skill game which involved regular sounds and sounds that were out of place, which the listener had to figure out. 
 The Making of Me - A short movie about birth and life starring Martin Short.
 Wonder Cycles - Stationary bicycles with a television attached. The faster riders pedaled, the faster the video played. The bicycles would take the rider on a short tour, with a selection of:
100th Anniversary Rose Parade Pasadena, California
Disneyland in California - The rider could see that day's park patrons watching the camera pass and moving out of the way for the operator.
Take a Little Ride: Microworld Bigtown, U.S.A.

Live entertainment
 Anacomical Players - A live show that featured improvisational skits on health and nutrition.

Shops
 Well and Goods Limited

Food services
 Pure & Simple

Gallery

See also
 Epcot
 Epcot attraction and entertainment history

References

External links 

Wonders of Life Festival Center Photo Gallery
"Erasing" Former Wonders of Life

Former Walt Disney Parks and Resorts attractions
Epcot
Amusement rides introduced in 1989
Amusement rides that closed in 2007
Future World (Epcot)
MetLife
Human body
1989 establishments in Florida
2007 disestablishments in Florida